Burton Gordon Malkiel (born August 28, 1932) is an American economist, financial executive, and writer most noted for his classic finance book A Random Walk Down Wall Street (first published 1973, in its 13th edition as of 2023). He is a leading proponent of the efficient-market hypothesis, which contends that prices of publicly traded assets reflect all publicly available information, although he has also pointed out that some markets are evidently inefficient, exhibiting signs of non-random walk.

Malkiel is the Chemical Bank chairman's professor of economics at Princeton University, and is a two-time chairman of the economics department there. He served as a member of the Council of Economic Advisers (1975–1977), president of the American Finance Association (1978), and dean of the Yale School of Management (1981–1988). He also spent 28 years as a director of the Vanguard Group. He currently serves as Chief Investment Officer to software-based financial advisor, Wealthfront Inc. and as a member of the Investment Advisory Board for Rebalance.

Malkiel in general supports buying and holding index funds as the most effective portfolio-management strategy, but does think it is viable to actively manage "around the edges" of such a portfolio, as financial markets are not totally efficient. In a 2020 interview, Malkiel also stated he was not opposed in principle to investing or trading in single stocks (as exemplified by the popularity of Robinhood), provided the large majority of one's portfolio is index funds.

Malkiel was elected to the American Philosophical Society in 2001.

Life and career
In 1949, Malkiel graduated from Boston Latin School, and went on to receive his bachelor's degree (1953) and his MBA (1955) from Harvard University. He originally went into the business world, but had always had an interest in academic economics and eventually earned his Ph.D. in economics from Princeton University in 1964 after completing a doctoral dissertation titled "Problems in the Structure of Financial Markets."

He married his first wife, Judith Atherton Malkiel, in 1954; they had one son, Jonathan. After Judith Malkiel's death in 1987, Burton Malkiel married his second wife, Nancy Weiss, in 1988. (Nancy Weiss Malkiel was Dean of the College of Princeton University from 1987 to 2011.) He served as a first lieutenant in the United States Army from 1955 to 1958.  

Malkiel serves on the advisory panel of Robert D. Arnott's investment management firm, Research Affiliates. Malkiel's hobbies include casino games and horse race betting, to which he applies mathematical and statistical analysis.

Notable works
In addition to several books, he has also written influential articles, including "The Valuation of Closed-End Investment Company Shares," Journal of Finance (1977). This article discussed the puzzle of why closed-end fund companies typically trade at market valuations lower than the net value of their assets. If net asset value and market capitalization are only two ways of measuring the same thing, then why is there a consistent difference between them?

On July 22, 2005, Malkiel retired from 28 years of service as a director of the Vanguard Group and trustee of Vanguard Mutual funds, yet remains closely affiliated with Vanguard due to Vanguard's similar investment philosophies.  In A Random Walk Down Wall Street, he frequently references Vanguard.

Malkiel is also the Chief Investment Officer of Wealthfront, an automated investment and savings service founded in 2008 currently with $10 billion under management.

Partial bibliography

 Burton G. Malkiel: A Random Walk Down Wall Street. The Best Investment Tactic for the New Century, Norton & Company, New York 2011

See also
 Brownian motion
 Stochastic process

References

Citations

Sources 

 "Malkiel, Burton Gordon". Who's Who in America. New Providence, NJ: Marquis, Who's Who, 2003.

1932 births
Living people
American business writers
American chief executives of financial services companies
American economists
American finance and investment writers
Chief investment officers
Financial economists
Harvard Business School alumni
Members of the American Philosophical Society
Presidents of the American Finance Association
Princeton University alumni
United States Council of Economic Advisers